Rocky Bay is a natural bay off the island of Newfoundland in the province of Newfoundland and Labrador, Canada. It lies to the north of Caplin Bay and to the south of Partridge Bay, opening to the Labrador Sea.

References

Bays of Newfoundland and Labrador